A Frail Becoming is the title of the fourth full-length album by Daylight Dies. It was released by Candlelight Records on October 9, 2012, four years after the release of the band's last album Lost to the Living.

Production and recording
Drummer Jesse Haff stated in an interview:

The recording of A Frail Becoming commenced late 2011. Bassist/vocalist Egan O'Rourke coordinated capturing individual performances of Haff, guitarists Barre Gambling and Charley Shackelford, and vocalist Nathan Ellis.

Haff notes:

Track listing

Credits

Nathan Ellis – harsh vocals
Barre Gambling – guitars
Charley Shackelford – guitars
Egan O'Rourke – bass, clean vocals
Jesse Haff – drums

Production

Jens Bogren – mixing (at Fascination Street Studios)
Egan O'Rourke - production and engineering
Jeff Dunne - drum editing
Jonathan Mehring – photography
Agni Kaster – packaging design

References

2012 albums
Daylight Dies albums
Candlelight Records albums